The Brisbane Broncos Rugby League Football Club Ltd., commonly referred to as the Broncos, is an Australian professional rugby league football club based in Brisbane, Queensland. Founded in April 1987, the Broncos play in Australia's elite competition, the National Rugby League (NRL) premiership. The club has won six premierships, including two New South Wales Rugby League premierships, a Super League premiership and three NRL premierships. The Broncos have won two World Club Challenges. The Broncos have achieved four minor premierships during its 35 years in multiple competitions. Prior to 2015, Brisbane had never been defeated in a grand final, and since 1991, the club has failed to qualify for the finals five times. The club is one of the most successful clubs in the National Rugby League since it began in 1998, winning three premierships (second only to the Sydney Roosters' four). The club is one of the most successful clubs in the history of rugby league, having won 59.9% of games played since its induction in 1988, second only to Melbourne Storm with 67.3%.

The club records the highest annual revenue of all NRL clubs – $A32.8m for the 2012 financial year – and is one of the most valuable clubs of any code in Australia, worth over $A42 million. Along with financial competitiveness, the Broncos have been voted one of Australia's most popular and most watched football teams, and has one of the highest average attendances of any rugby league club in the world; 33,337 in the 2012 NRL season.

The club was founded in April 1987 as part of the Winfield Cup's national expansion, becoming, along with the Gold Coast-Tweed Giants, one of Queensland's first two participants in the New South Wales Rugby League premiership. The Broncos later became the dominant force in the competition before playing a significant role in the Super League War of the mid-1990s, then continuing to compete successfully in the newly created National Rugby League competition. It is the only publicly listed sports club on the Australian Securities Exchange, trading as Brisbane Broncos Limited.

Following the conclusion of the 2020 regular season, in which the club secured its first wooden spoon, head coach Anthony Seibold announced his resignation on 26 August 2020. The Broncos Board moved quickly and offered Kevin Walters the vacant role of head coach on a 2-year contract.

History

Beginnings (1988-1991)
A Brisbane license was the Queensland Rugby League's direct response to the threat posed by the VFL's (now AFL) expansion team the Brisbane Bears which was granted a license in 1986 for entry in the 1987 season. Soon after the granting of the license, QRL officials mobilized, seeking a NSWRL franchise and rich backers. The aim of QRL general manager Ross Livermore was specifically to stifle the VFL's publicity and promotions in the state.

The QRL's bid was bolstered by Queensland's success in the 1980s, the early years of the State of Origin series between Queensland and New South Wales, in addition to the inclusion of a combined Brisbane Rugby League team in the mid-week competition, convinced the New South Wales Rugby League (NSWRL) to invite a Queensland-based team into the competition. After tough competition between the various syndicates for the Brisbane licence, the QRL chose the bid of former Brisbane Rugby League (BRL) players, Barry Maranta and Paul Morgan. At the first meeting with the NSWRL hierarchy, the newly formed Brisbane Broncos were asked to pay a $500,000 fee.

The Broncos secured the services of Australia national rugby league team captain Wally Lewis to be the inaugural club captain and former BRL and then Canberra Raiders coach Wayne Bennett, on top of a host of other talented players including Chris Johns, Allan Langer, Terry Matterson, Gene Miles and Kerrod Walters. The team made their debut in the NSWRL's 1988 Winfield Cup premiership against reigning premiers, the Manly-Warringah Sea Eagles, and defeated them 44–10. They sat inside the Top 4 for a majority of the season, even sitting in 1st for 3 weeks. But the competition race was so tight, a 16–4 loss to the South Sydney Rabbitohs in Round 14 was enough to drop them from 2nd to 6th. Brisbane would not return to the Top 5, and a 20–10 loss to eventual runners up Balmain Tigers denied them the chance to enter a playoff for 5th place. Leading into 1989, Brisbane recruited Sam Backo from the Raiders while Steve Renouf was given his first grade debut. In their second season they won the mid-week knockout competition, the 1989 Panasonic Cup, but their league performance again revolved around a midseason slump, this time a 5-game losing streak which dropped them from 2nd to 7th. Brisbane would recover to enter a playoff for the 5th and final spot in the finals, but lost 38–14 to the Cronulla Sharks, ending their season.

Leading up to the 1990 season, Brisbane recruited Kevin Walters from Canberra. However, the biggest news was the decision of Bennett to remove Lewis as club captain on the basis that he wasn't a good trainer or teammate, with Miles resuming the captaincy of the side. While the move was controversial, it seemed to have the desired effect, as the Broncos finished the season in 2nd, qualifying for their maiden finals series. Their finals debut was an upset 26–16 loss to the Penrith Panthers in the major Preliminary Semi, before they beat Manly 12–4 in the Minor Semi to qualify for a Preliminary Final showdown with Canberra. With a spot in the Grand Final on the line, Brisbane collapsed in sensational fashion at the Sydney Football Stadium (SFS), losing 32–4. Lewis, still upset about Bennett's treatment of his captaincy, left the club to go to the Gold Coast. He was replaced by Trevor Gilmeister, who joined from the Eastern Suburbs Roosters. Unfortunately, Brisbane endured their worst season to date in 1991, spending just 2 weeks total inside the Top 5 and hovering around 10th for much of the year before a 5-game winning streak saw them finish 7th, just a solitary draw outside a playoff for 5th place.

The Golden Age and Super League (1992-1997)

Leading up to 1992, Brisbane landed another major piece from the Raiders, premiership winning prop Glenn Lazarus. The retirement of Miles saw Langer appointed club captain.  Despite the new captain, 1992 was by far their best season yet, never sitting below 4th on the ladder and finishing the season with the minor premiership. The Illawarra Steelers met them in the Major Semi Final, where Brisbane took a 22–12 win to go into the first Grand Final in club history. 14 days later, they met the St George Dragons at the SFS. After a cagey first half which saw Brisbane lead 8–6 at the break, the Broncos dominated the second 40 minutes, with Langer and backrower Allan Cann crossing for 2 tries each in a 28–8 victory. Langer was named Clive Churchill Medallist for his phenomenal performance.

Brisbane's Premiership defence in 1993 got off to a slow start, but they would recover to return to contention for the minor premiership. On the last round of the season, Brisbane took on St George, needing a win to keep their minor premiership hopes alive. St George won 16–10, and wins to Manly and the Canterbury-Bankstown Bulldogs saw Brisbane drop from 2nd all the way to 5th, plunging them into sudden death football, all matches being played in Sydney. They ended Manly's season with a dominant 36–10 win, then took on a Canberra side whose form had plummeted following a broken leg to superstar halfback Ricky Stuart, and Brisbane cast them aside 30–12. Brisbane then met minor premiers Canterbury for a spot in the Grand Final, and their season looked on tenterhooks as the Bulldogs took a 16-10 halftime lead. But Brisbane steeled and won 23–16, and set up a Grand Final rematch with the Dragons. No team had ever won the NSWRL from 5th, however Brisbane became the first to do so when they won a defensive dogfight 14–6, winning back to back premierships, the last team to do so in a unified comp until the Roosters in 2018–19. During that season, they also handed future dual-international winger Wendell Sailor his first grade debut.

1994 was a tough year for Brisbane, they didn't reach the Top 5 until Round 8 before dropping out and not returning until Round 17, ultimately finishing 5th. Brisbane again ended Manly's season in the first week of the finals, this time 16–4, but they could not repeat the magic of '93, with a Jason Taylor field goal ending their season in a heart breaking 15–14 loss to the North Sydney Bears. In 1995, the Super League War broke out.  After threats of expulsion from the NSWRL, the Broncos were one of the last clubs to sign with the new league and all players followed suit (The Canberra Raiders, Canterbury Bulldogs and Cronulla Sharks were the first to sign, and it was only revealed many years later that the Broncos were in fact one of the last clubs to sign for either competition). Broncos CEO John Ribot moved to take over the running of the rebel Super League, leading to a perception that the conflict was orchestrated by the club. The 1995 season, the first under the ARL banner, went pretty well for Brisbane- they sat in the Top 4 for most of the year, finished 3rd, and unearthed a pair of future club legends- rugged prop Shane Webcke and future Golden Boot winner Darren Lockyer. Unfortunately, Brisbane couldn't capitalise in the first 8-team finals series, losing to the Raiders 14–8 in the qualifying final before falling 24–10 to the eventual Premiers, the now-Sydney Bulldogs. 1996 went pretty similarly- sit comfortably in the Top 4 and ultimately finish 2nd, only to lose 21–16 to North Sydney and 22–16 to the Cronulla Sharks to end their season.

Brisbane's decision to side with the Super League saw a host of players join them from the ARL- most notably St George pair Anthony Mundine and Gordon Tallis, which offset the departure of longtime hooker Kerrod Walters to the Adelaide Rams. Brisbane dominated the Super League season, never leaving 1st position after Round 5 and beating Cronulla 34-2 and then 2 weeks later 26–8 to win the title in convincing fashion. Brisbane also competed in the World Club Challenge, going undefeated in their group (including a 76-0 demolition of Halifax Blue Sox), before beating St Helens 66–12, the Auckland Warriors 22-16 and the Hunter Mariners 36–12 to win the only edition of the costly tournament.

Unified competition, sixth premiership (1998-2006)

Brisbane entered the 1998 NRL season as one of the favourites to win the unified competition- despite the return of Mundine to the Dragons and the departure of Lazarus to become the inaugural captain of the newly formed Melbourne Storm. Despite a rocky period which saw them drop to 6th after 14 rounds, Brisbane stormed home on a 12-game unbeaten run to seal the minor premiership. They were also able to fill the hole of Lazarus by debuting Petero Civoniceva.Despite this form however, they were stunned 15-10 by the Parramatta Eels in their first finals match, meaning they would need an extra game to qualify for the Grand Final. They responded in typical Brisbane style- routing Melbourne and Sydney City (formerly Eastern Suburbs) 30-6 and 46-18 respectively to qualify for the big dance, where they ended Canterbury's dream finals run with a 38–12 victory. The rampaging Tallis was named Clive Churchill Medallist after a dominant performance in the middle of the park, including a try from dummy half.

1999 was disappointing for the club with a terrible early-season form hindering their attempt at a third consecutive premiership losing 8 of their first 10 matches. Club legend Langer retired mid-season, with Kevin Walters taking over the captaincy. The club went on another 12 game unbeaten run and ultimately qualified for the finals in 8th position, however their season ended in a dominant 42–20 loss against minor premiers Cronulla. The season wasn't all negative, as future Queensland representatives Dane Carlaw, Lote Tuqiri and Chris Walker all made first grade debuts for the club, although club legend Renouf did leave to finish his career with the Wigan Warriors. But Brisbane responded with a dominant 2000 season, buoyed by the signing of Ben Ikin to fill the hole left by Langer. Brisbane dominated the regular season, running away with the minor premiership, before beating the Sharks 34-20 and the Eels 16–10 to book a Grand Final matchup with the Roosters. The Broncos ground out a 14–6 victory for their 5th title in 9 years, with Lockyer receiving the Clive Churchill Medal for his performance. 2000 also saw the debut of even more future representative players- Ashley Harrison, Justin Hodges, Brad Meyers and Carl Webb. After just one full season as captain, Walters retired (although he would have a 5-game comeback in 2001), with Tallis anointed as club captain, and young North Queensland Cowboys half Scott Prince was brought in as his replacement

2001 saw the beginning of the Broncos "Post-Origin Slump", a succession of losing streaks after Origin which sees Brisbane slide down the ladder and disappoint in the finals. In Round 19, Brisbane sat 2nd on the ladder, before losing 6 straight matches and finishing the year in 5th place. They fell 22–6 to Cronulla in the Qualifying Final, before beating the now-merged St George-Illawarra Dragons 44–28 to secure a Preliminary Final berth, where they were defeated 24-16 by minor premiers Parramatta. The year saw the debut of 2 more future stars- the speedy Brent Tate as well as goal kicking forward Corey Parker. A brutal knee injury suffered by Ikin would sideline him for all of 2002, and while a neck injury to Tallis threatened to end his career, he would return at the start of the next season. Sailor would also leave the club, enticed by a massive offer from the Queensland Reds to switch codes. Hodges also left the club, the offer of guaranteed gametime from the Roosters too much for him to ignore. After joining the Warrington Wolves and making a stunning comeback to the Queensland squad, Langer returned to the club for one last season in 2002 to help ease their halves problem. Brisbane finished the year in 3rd position, although they were challenging for the minor premiership until they lost 4 of their last 5 matches. Brisbane eliminated Parramatta with a 24–14 win, but fell in the Preliminary Final for the second year in a row, losing 16–12 to the eventual premiers, the Roosters. 2002 also saw one of the greatest moments in Brisbane's club history- in a Round 12 clash with the Wests Tigers, missing 15 regular first graders as well as head coach Bennett due to injuries and Origin, a Broncos squad captained by Shane Walker and coached by assistant Craig Bellamy pulled off a stunning 28–14 victory. Just a year after Sailor went to Rugby Union, his former wing partner Tuqiri joined him, joining the New South Wales Waratahs. Wing partner Chris Walker also jumped ship, heading to the South Sydney Rabbitohs on a big contract.

2003 saw one of the worst "Post-Origin Slumps" in club history. The club sat 1st as late as Round 17, and were comfortably positioned 3rd after 19 weeks before both Tallis and Lockyer were felled by injuries in the Round 19 win over Melbourne. Brisbane dropped their last 7 matches, even after the return of their 2 superstar for the last 2 weeks of the season, and dropped to 8th place on the ladder- their season ending in the Qualifying Final when minor premiers and eventual premiers Penrith reversed an 18-10 half time deficit to beat Brisbane 28–18. That year did see the debuts of Neville Costigan and Sam Thaiday. Meanwhile, Prince had struggled to find game time after 2001 and left for the Tigers, where he would win the 2005 Clive Churchill medal and captain the side to premiership glory in one of the biggest "Ones that Got Away" for the Broncos. The club again had a bounceback year in 2004, with the shock move of Lockyer from fullback to five-eighth a major catalyst for their success. Of course, it helped that his replacement at fullback, 17 year old sensation Karmichael Hunt, was able to fit straight into the Broncos side. Brisbane spent almost the entire season inside the Top 4 and finished in 3rd position, but were stunned 31-14 by Melbourne, who had Bellamy as their head coach. This set them up with a sudden death semi final against the Cowboys, who they were undefeated against leading into the match. Brisbane volunteered to move the match from Accor Stadium to Willows Sports Complex, and the Cowboys responded by using their raucous home support to stun their "Big Brothers" 10–0. The match would be the last for a host of club icons- captain Tallis and Ikin both retired, their NSW representative goal kicking winger Michael De Vere (Huddersfield Giants) and Queensland prop Meyers (Bradford Bulls) left for the English Super League, while their other Origin prop Webb joined the Cowboys. With Lockyer named club captain and Hodges returning to the club, Brisbane dominated the start of the 2005 season and sat in 1st position after 24 rounds, but 5 straight losses to end the season saw them again slide to 3rd, where they again lost in the opening week to Melbourne, this time 24–18. This sent them into another semi final, this time against Prince and the eventual premiers Tigers, who brushed the Broncos aside 34–6.

Leading into 2006, Brisbane were able to retain a similar squad to 2005- Ben Hannant proved to be a key rotational piece after arriving from the Roosters, Darius Boyd made his first grade debut and would be a key part of Brisbane's backline, and longtime Queensland Cup veteran Shane Perry would become the solution for Brisbane's halfback spot. After being inside the Top 2 after Round 17, the Broncos again entered the post-Origin slump, losing 5 consecutive games. This season however, they reversed this run of form, winning 5 straight games to close out the regular season in 3rd. This had come after Bennett had signed a secret deal to become the Roosters coach from 2007, but reneged on the deal after it became public. Despite the reverse in form, it looked like their finals success was going on par with previous seasons after they fell 20–4 against the Dragons in the qualifying final. But Brisbane got a break against an injury hit Knights squad, and Brisbane took a crushing 50–6 victory to qualify for their first Preliminary Final in 4 seasons. Brisbane took on the Bulldogs, and their season was on life support when Canterbury led 20–6 at half time. The lead prompted Bulldogs prop Willie Mason to exclaim “We're going to the grand final!”. That sledge sparked a dramatic Broncos comeback, as they ran in a 31-0 second half to blitz the Bulldogs 37-20 and book a spot in the Grand Final against Melbourne. Despite being massive underdogs, Brisbane looked in control throughout the entire match, and a Darren Lockyer field goal sealed a dramatic 15–8 victory and Brisbane's 6th premiership. Unsung hooker Shaun Berrigan was awarded the Clive Churchill Medal for his aggressive performance in the ruck. Webcke had already announced his intention to retire, and did so as a champion.

Bennett's final years (2007-2008)

Once again, Brisbane started a premiership defence poorly, losing 7 of their first 10 to sit 15th, but their stay at the bottom of the table was abruptly ended when they produced a club record 71–6 victory over a battered Knights side. Brisbane climbed back up the ladder to sit 5th after Origin, but their season again took a turn in a Round 18 clash with the Cowboys, when Lockyer's season abruptly ended with a torn ACL. Brisbane would lose 5 of their last 7 matches, including a 68-22 thrashing at the hands of the Eels, and would end the season in 8th place and being thrashed 40-0 by the Storm in the Qualifying Final. Civoniceva left the club for Penrith, upset that they had prioritised the signing of Panthers prop Joel Clinton over retaining him. Tate also departed for the Warriors, while Berrigan left for Hull FC. In their place came Clinton, Eels hooker PJ Marsh and another ex-Panther, Peter Wallace, who would replace the ageing Perry as Lockyer's halves partner. 

Lockyer, however, missed some serious game time in 2008 and wasn't 100% healthy until Round 18, at which point Brisbane sat 7th on the ladder. But the bigger news to come out of the start of that season was Bennett's decision to walk out of the final year of his contract to become the head coach of the Dragons from 2009. Bennett had seen his relationship with the Broncos board deteriorate after his courtship with the Roosters, and decided to leave after 21 seasons with the club. His former assistant Bellamy seemed set for a return to Brisbane as his replacement, only to blindside the club by re-signing with the Storm after a botched interview. Ultimately, it was decided that longtime assistant Ivan Henjak would be promoted to the head coaching role from 2009, and he began taking more of a role in training. With Lockyer returning, Brisbane won 6 of their final 9 games to finish 5th, and upset the Roosters 24–16 in the qualifying final to set up a semi final showdown with Bellamy and the Storm. Brisbane led 14–12 with under 10 minutes to go, and seemed to have won the game when Hannant crossed the line, with Bennett seen displaying a rare show of emotion. But the video referee deemed Hannant was held up, and a few minutes later an Ashton Sims knock on saw Greg Inglis score for the Storm to seal a late 16–14 victory, breaking Brisbane hearts and ending their season.

The Rebuild (2009-2014)

2009 saw a wave of change around Red Hill- not only was there a new head coach, but a host of roster changes. Boyd joined Bennett at the Dragons, the representative foursome of Hannant, Greg Eastwood, Michael Ennis and David Stagg all joined the Bulldogs, and boom winger Denan Kemp, who tied the club record with 4 tries in a single game against the Eels, was lured away to the Warriors. In their place was boom teenager Israel Folau, young back rower Ben Te'o and a host of club-developed talent, including Gerard Beale, Alex Glenn, Josh McGuire, Andrew McCullough and Jharal Yow Yeh. Brisbane sat Top 4 until the Origin period, when they collapsed, conceding 40+ points in 3 straight games, an extra 44–12 loss to South Sydney and a then-club record 56-0 thrashing at the hands of the Raiders, leaving them dangling in 10th position. But 5 straight wins to close out the season, including a 22–10 win over Canberra just 36 days later, saw them finish in 6th position. This revival was largely due to the emergence of rampaging forward Dave Taylor. The Broncos stunned the 3rd place Titans 40–32 in the qualifying final, setting up a showdown with Bennett's Dragons in a sudden death semi final. Brisbane took one up on their former mentor with a dominant 24–10 victory, however Wallace fractured his ankle in the win, leaving them without a recognised halfback ahead of their preliminary final matchup with the Storm, one of the bigger reasons they fell 40–10. 

2010 saw  significant roster changes: the injury-enforced retirement of Marsh, Taylor's decision to move to the Rabbitohs and Karmichael Hunt's decision to switch to the AFL with the Gold Coast Suns. Furthermore, they received a massive blow during pre-season when Hodges ruptured his achilles, causing him to miss the entire season. Brisbane stuttered and lost 6 of their first 8 matches, before reversing form and entering the Top 8. But in their Round 22 clash with the Cowboys, Lockyer took a hit and injured his rib cartilage. Despite his best efforts, Lockyer missed the rest of the regular season, and without him Brisbane slumped to 4 straight defeats, sliding from 7th to 10th and missing the finals for the first time since 1991. An even bigger blow for Brisbane was a contract saga involving Greg Inglis, who was departing the Melbourne Storm in the wake of their salary cap saga. Inglis had agreed in principle to join the Broncos for 2011 onward, but then decided to cancel a flight to Brisbane to sign the contract under the alibi that  "It's raining and I don't think the planes are flying". Behind the scenes, former Bronco Anthony Mundine was convincing Inglis to join the Rabbitohs, which he did a week later. Inglis would've replaced Folau, who followed Hunt's lead in switching to the AFL, this time to the Greater Western Sydney Giants. On a positive note, the season saw the debut of future international Matt Gillett.

In February 2011, it was announced that Henjak was to be sacked from the club, only three weeks before the beginning of the season. Anthony Griffin, Henjak's assistant, took over as coach for the 2011 season, becoming just the third head coach in the history of Broncos. Ben Hannant also returned to the club, but even more pressing was the decision of Lockyer to retire after the season, ending a 16-year playing career which, in Round 22, saw him overtake Terry Lamb and Steve Menzies for the most first grade games played, finishing at 355, a record which would stand until Cameron Smith overtook him in 2017. Brisbane stagnated for a little while, but finished the season in 3rd position, setting up a qualifying finals matchup with the Warriors which they won 40–10, meaning they would head to take on the Dragons once again in the semi finals. Bennett, who had looked like he was set to rejoin the Broncos in 2012, had announced that he was joining Newcastle at the end of the season- meaning the match would either be the last of Lockyer's career, or Bennett's last with the Dragons. Brisbane led 12-6 towards the end of the game before Lockyer caught Beale's knee in his face, fracturing his cheekbone. St George Illawarra tied the game, necessitating Golden Point, where an injured Lockyer slotted home a field goal to seal a 13–12 win and keep Brisbane in the finals. Unfortunately, Lockyer was unable to play in the Preliminary Final against Manly, which the Sea Eagles won 26–14.

2012 marked the Broncos' 25th season in the NRL competition. Civoniceva returned for one last season, and Thaiday was appointed club captain. The club also lost winger Jharal Yow Yeh in Round 4 to a brutal leg injury, suffering a compound fracture in his leg and an ankle dislocation. Yow Yeh retired in 2014, as he never fully recovered from the injury. Brisbane spent much of the season inside the Top 4, but another "Post-Origin Slide" saw them finish 8th, and they were eliminated by the Cowboys 33–16 in the Qualifying Final. Beale (Dragons) and Te'o (Rabbitohs) both left the club, along with the retiring Civoniceva, and Prince returned to the club for his swansong. Unfortunately, 2013 was not a good year for Brisbane- they were out of the Top 8 after Round 10 and never returned, finishing 12th, the lowest position in club history at the time. Future Origin winger Corey Oates made his debut during this season, however. Prince retired and Wallace returned to the Panthers, largely because of the emergence of Ben Hunt as the club's halfback. 

Perhaps one of their biggest signings in quite some time, former Dally M Medallist Ben Barba joined the club in 2014 as their marquee signing. Barba attempted to join the Broncos one year prior, but was refused a release by the Bulldogs. Todd Lowrie, Martin Kennedy and Daniel Vidot also joined the Broncos from the Warriors, Roosters and Dragons respectively. There was also a change in the club captaincy, with Thaiday standing down and being replaced by a co-captain structure of Hodges and Parker. 

The Broncos failed to find any sort of consistency during the season, their best patch of form being four straight wins against the Titans, Tigers, Sea Eagles and Raiders. They also experienced their worst collapse as a club against the Cronulla Sharks at home in Round 16, where they led the Sharks 22-0 at one stage, ultimately falling 24-22 by full time. Brisbane never really challenged for the title throughout the season and ultimately finished 8th, again being eliminated by the Cowboys in the Qualifying Final, this time by the score of 32–20. That game would be Griffin's last as head coach, as it had been announced mid-season that Wayne Bennett was set to return to the Broncos from 2015.

Bennett's second stint (2015-2018)

The roster change under Bennett was dramatic from the moment he returned. Ben Barba was released after just one season, eventually joining Cronulla. Ben Hannant left for the Cowboys, and Kiwi international Josh Hoffman departed for the Gold Coast. In return, Darius Boyd returned to the club, and was joined by ex-Tiger enforcer Adam Blair and boom Raider Anthony Milford, as well as a pair of up and coming rookies in Joe Ofahengaue and Kodi Nikorima making their debuts. The captaincy underwent another change as well, with Hodges given sole captaincy of the club. Their campaign started rocky, a 36-6 thrashing at the hands of South Sydney, but they soon found their feet and won 8 straight matches during the Origin period - a drastic change from the previous years - ultimately finishing the season in 2nd place. They took down the Cowboys 16–12 in the Qualifying Final to advance straight to a Preliminary Final showdown with the minor premier Roosters. A Boyd intercept try inside the first minute set the tone for the clash, and Brisbane would dominate 31–12 to advance to a Grand Final showdown with the Cowboys. In what is considered by some commentators to be one of the best Grand Finals in recent history, the Broncos led 16-12 for much of the second half before Cowboys winger Kyle Feldt scored in the corner on the last play of regulation to tie the match. Superstar half Johnathan Thurston missed the subsequent conversion, sending the clash to golden point. The  Broncos won the golden point coin toss and elected to receive, putting them in a great position to win the match. However, off the kickoff, Ben Hunt knocked on, giving the Cowboys possession just metres out from the Broncos line. Thurston kicked a field goal 2 minutes into the Golden Point period to win the match for the Cowboys 17–16, ending the season in jubilation for Townsville and heartbreak for Brisbane.

Justin Hodges retired after the Grand Final, and the captaincy was again given to Corey Parker. James Roberts, a speedy centre, had been lured away from the Titans at the last minute to join the Broncos, and he was joined by young Raiders forward Tevita Pangai Junior and young back rower Jai Arrow, who had emerged from Brisbane's development program. Brisbane started the season strongly but endured a "Post-Origin Slump" to drop out of the Top 4, finishing in 5th. After eliminating the Titans 44–28 in the Qualifying Final, Brisbane travelled to Townsville for a knockout clash with the Cowboys. In another classic between the two sides, the game went into extra time - a new rule brought in after their grand final thriller 12 months earlier. At 20-all, when a Michael Morgan try sealed a 26–20 win for the Cowboys, ending their season - the third time in 5 years their season had concluded in Townsville. Parker retired after the match, but Brisbane brought in embattled ex-New Zealand halfback Benji Marshall on a lifeline deal, as well as established prop Korbin Sims from Newcastle and experienced winger David Mead from the Gold Coast. Darius Boyd was also named club captain for 2017. 

Prior to the start of the 2017 season it was announced Hunt had signed a large contract with the Dragons beginning in 2018, and that likely contributed to a season where Hunt was dropped to reserve grade and the bench, before finishing the season at hooker after Andrew McCullough tore his ACL. Brisbane started their 2017 campaign in shaky fashion, winning two of their first five games, the club sitting in ninth position at the end of Round 5. Following this, the Broncos found their form and re-entered the top 8 without exiting it again, finishing the 2017 season in 3rd, but with a 4 win gap between them and the 1st placed Storm. Making matters worse, Boyd was injured in their Round 26 win over the Cowboys, and missed their 24–22 loss in a classic Qualifying Final against the Roosters, before the Boyd-less Broncos advanced to another Preliminary Final with a 13–6 win over the Panthers. Boyd was rushed back into the squad for the showdown with runaway favourites Melbourne, but was clearly not healthy and didn't do much to alter the 30–0 defeat. 

Along with Ben Hunt, Jai Arrow, Adam Blair and Benji Marshall also left the club, departing for the Titans, Warriors and Tigers respectively. Jack Bird was the club's marquee signing, joining from Cronulla, although his season lasted just 8 games as he dealt with injury. Wayne Bennett blamed Cronulla for Jack Bird's injury problems, as he had claimed that Cronulla had told Bird that he was not injured and did not require surgery before departing for Brisbane. 

The Broncos also had signed prop  Matt Lodge on a one-year deal, a move which attracted controversy, as Lodge had been out of the NRL due to his arrest in New York during the 2015 off-season. While many in the media and the NRL fanbase called for Lodge's contract to be deregistered, Bennett and the Broncos stood by Lodge. 

2018 also saw a major success from Brisbane's youth, with debuts handed out to Payne Haas, David Fifita, Kotoni Staggs and Jake Turpin. Brisbane, however, were not the team they had been, and instead of being in the Top 4 race, they were just looking to make the finals. A big 48–16 win over Manly, which saw Corey Oates score 4 tries, saw the club finish in 6th, but just one win separated them from 1st, such was the tightness of the competition. The following week, Brisbane were eliminated from the finals series after being defeated 48–18 by a highly unfancied St George-Illawarra side. The loss was also the final game for the retiring Sam Thaiday. 

After the 2018 season, a rift emerged between Bennett and CEO Paul White, which ultimately saw Bennett sign with the Rabbitohs to become coach from 2020. Just weeks later, Bennett was sacked as the head coach for making preseason plans with the Rabbitohs for the following year, and in return South Sydney appointed Bennett as head coach with immediate effect, freeing up their coach Anthony Seibold, who had already signed with Brisbane from 2020, to become the Broncos head coach for 2019.

Anthony Seibold era (2019-2020)

Along with Bennett, a host of key players left Brisbane. Josh McGuire left for North Queensland and Korbin Sims for St. George Illawarra, then halfway through the season, James Roberts, Jaydn Su'A and Kodi Nikorima also departed the club for the Rabbitohs and Warriors. Jack Bird once again dealt with injuries, only playing 9 games, and it quickly became clear that the now 32 year old Darius Boyd had lost a step. The Broncos handed debuts to Patrick Carrigan, Xavier Coates, Tom Dearden, Herbie Farnworth and Keenan Palasia, while also signing Rhys Kennedy and James Segeyaro mid-season. A four match losing streak early in the season set the tone for the club, as they sat 14th after Round 16, only to go on a run of 6 wins and a draw from their last 10 games to ensure they finished in 8th place. They played Parramatta in week one of the finals at the new Bankwest Stadium and lost the match 58–0, marking the club's worst ever defeat. It was also the biggest finals loss in the history of the competition which eclipsed the previous record set by Newtown when they defeated St George 55–7 in the 1944 finals series. It also extended the club's longest ever premiership drought to thirteen seasons. The club signed out of favour half Brodie Croft from the Melbourne Storm on a three year deal, beginning in 2020.

2020 started well for Brisbane, winning their first two games against North Queensland and South Sydney, before the competition was suspended upon completion of round 2 due to the impact of the COVID-19 pandemic. When the competition returned from its unscheduled hiatus in late May, the optimism at the Broncos fizzled out quickly, as they lost 34–6 to Parramatta in the first game of the season restart. The club then recorded their worst ever loss the following week against the Sydney Roosters, losing 59–0. The losses continued to pile up for Brisbane, the mid-season signing of Issac Luke and the return of Ben Te'o making almost no impact. The Broncos were also impacted by injuries, as many players missed more than half of the shortened season.

The club's only post COVID lockdown victory came against fellow bottom of the ladder team, Canterbury-Bankstown in round 9. After a 28–10 loss to South Sydney, Anthony Seibold resigned as coach of the Brisbane Broncos, with assistant Peter Gentle taking over as caretaker coach until the end of the season.

While the Brisbane club were more competitive under Gentle, the club would lose their final 11 matches of the season in a row including a 36–8 loss to the Canberra Raiders despite leading 8–6 at half time, another big loss against the Sydney Roosters, this time 58–12 at the Sydney Cricket Ground and a 32–16 loss in the final round to North Queensland which condemned Brisbane to the club's first ever wooden spoon after Canterbury-Bankstown beat Souths in round 19 to leap ahead of the Brisbane club on the ladder on points differential. Darius Boyd and Jordan Kahu both retired at the end of the 2020 season, while David Fifita would be departing as well to join the Titans.

Kevin Walters era (2021-present)

After missing out on the signature of Craig Bellamy as head coach, Kevin Walters was signed as coach for the 2021 NRL season for two years. Walters moved on two of Brisbane's players who were on large contracts in Jack Bird and Joe Ofahengaue, with the two signing with St. George Illawarra and Wests Tigers. Brisbane brought in experienced players, John Asiata, Albert Kelly, David Mead, Dale Copley and Danny Levi in an attempt to take pressure off the young players. Walters named Alex Glenn as the captain for the 2021 season.

The problems at Red Hill continued, firstly surrendering a 16–0 lead against Parramatta in their season opener to concede the next 24 points without an answer to end up losing 16–24, followed by losing 16–28 to local rivals, the Gold Coast Titans to record their 13th loss in a row. In round 3  Brisbane recorded their first victory in 259 days after they beat Canterbury-Bankstown 24-0.

In round 8 of the 2021 NRL season, Brisbane staged an incredible comeback against the Gold Coast. After being down 22-0, Brisbane would go on to win the match 36-28.

An unlikely round 11 win against the Sydney Roosters at the Sydney Cricket Ground saw the Brisbane club end a 13-game losing streak outside of Queensland, however losses to Melbourne, St. George Illawarra, Canberra and South Sydney saw Brisbane once again fall to the bottom of the ladder as of round 15.  The club would go on to win four of their last nine games to avoid the Wooden Spoon and finish in 14th place. Alex Glenn retired after this game, marking the end of a twelve year career.

Even though Brisbane struggled, Tyson Gamble emerged as a serviceable half for the club. Gamble was limited to two games in 2020, but managed more game time under Walters, as he chopped and changed halves pairings throughout the season. The club also lured Karmichael Hunt back from the NSW Waratahs, twelve years after he initially departed the Broncos for Australian rules football.

During the season, the Brisbane club ran the broom through the front office and the playing group. Paul White resigned as CEO and was replaced with Dave Donaghy from the Storm. Donaghy began his tenure in the middle of 2021, after a lengthy legal process that prevented him from commencing his role earlier in the year. Former Bronco Ben Ikin was hired as the Football and Performance Director. The turnaround for Brisbane's recruitment seemingly began when the club announced the signing of embattled Rabbitohs half Adam Reynolds on a three year deal from 2022 onwards. In addition to Reynolds, the club also signed Ryan James from the Raiders, Cowboys forward Corey Jensen, Kurt Capewell from the Panthers, as well as Jordan Pereira and Tyrone Roberts as depth signings. In addition to the new signings at the club, many of the young players extended their contracts to keep them at the Broncos, something that was becoming a rarity ever since 2018. Ben Te'o and Karmichael Hunt quietly retired from rugby league, while Danny Levi, Anthony Milford, John Asiata, Brodie Croft, Xavier Coates and Richard Kennar departed for other clubs. Jesse Arthars was also sent to the New Zealand Warriors on a loan deal for the 2022 season, expected to return for the 2023 campaign. Ex-Cowboy Te Maire Martin also made his NRL return with the Broncos, having initially retired three years prior due to a bleed on his brain. Adam Reynolds was named as the captain for the Brisbane in the 2022 season.

2022 began well for Brisbane, despite losing captain Adam Reynolds to COVID-19 in their Round 1 clash against the South Sydney Rabbitohs. They won their opening games against South Sydney and the Canterbury-Bankstown Bulldogs to sit in the top 8 at the end of the round for the first time since 2020. They then went on to lose three games in a row, before going on a seven game winning streak, including a 38-0 thrashing of Manly and another comeback victory against the Gold Coast Titans. This was the longest winning streak the Broncos had experienced since winning six straight games under Wayne Bennett in 2017. During the club's winning streak, the club was rocked by star forward Payne Haas requesting a release, which was denied. During the Round 12 clash against the Gold Coast, Haas was relentlessly booed by Brisbane fans when he had the ball.

The Broncos' seven-game winning streak was broken by the Melbourne Storm, who had beaten the Brisbane side 32-20 after a shaky start. Brisbane were defeated 40-26 by North Queensland the following week, before winning three games in a row. The last placed Wests Tigers defeated Brisbane at home in an upset, winning 32-18. This match saw Patrick Carrigan placed on report for a 'hip drop' tackle on Jackson Hastings, which caused an injury to the Tigers' half and ended his season. Carrigan missed four matches due to suspension. After losing to the Sydney Roosters the following week, Brisbane seemed to be back on track after beating the Newcastle Knights 28-10. The final three rounds were a nightmare for the Broncos, as they recorded a 60-12 loss against the Storm, a 53-6 loss against the Eels, then a 22-12 loss to St. George Illawarra in the final round of the regular season. Brisbane's horrific performances saw them drop out of the top 8 and miss the finals for a third straight season, the longest consecutive finals drought in Brisbane's history to date. The club also made history for the wrong reasons, being the first club to miss the finals with more wins than losses since Canberra in 1999, as well as being the first club to sit in the top four after Round 17 and miss the finals.

During the 2022 season, rumours had persisted that Warriors fullback Reece Walsh was seeking a return to Australia after the New Zealand Warriors had announced that they would be returning to New Zealand. However, both the Warriors and Walsh denied the rumours and insisted that he was committed to the move. In July, however, reports began emerging that Walsh was granted a release from the Warriors and that he was looking to return to a Queensland team. On July 7, the Broncos confirmed the signing of Walsh for 2023 and beyond. To accommodate Walsh in the salary cap, Martin was given permission to negotiate with other clubs and signed with the New Zealand Warriors from 2023 onwards.

Emblem and colours 
It had originally been planned for the Brisbane Broncos to adopt a logo incorporating both a kangaroo and a stylised "Q" which had been featured in the logo for the Queensland Rugby League for many years. However, with the Australian national rugby league team also known as the Kangaroos, this was deemed inappropriate and conflicting. The state flower the Cooktown Orchid and the Poinsettia which had long been used by Brisbane representative teams in the Bulimba Cup and midweek knockout competitions was also ruled out, along with other Australian animals such as the brumby, possum, galah and the kookaburra, which was used on Brisbane's Kookaburra Queen paddleships.

Having wanted to continue with the use of alliteration for local sporting teams such as the Brisbane Bullets and Brisbane Bears (later the Brisbane Lions), the club's directors eventually decided on the nickname Broncos. This name was chosen by Barry Maranta because he was a fan of an NFL team, the Denver Broncos. The Australian newspaper has described the name as "Mystifyingly American".

The original club logo was first featured in the Broncos' inaugural season in the premiership in 1988 and was used until 1999. It used a mostly gold colour scheme, in line with the predominant colour on the team jerseys. In 2000, the club adopted a new logo with a more maroon design, which was much closer to the traditional colour associated with Queensland rugby league and Queensland sport in general. This design continues to be used to date.

Traditionally, the colours of the Brisbane Broncos have been maroon, white and gold, which have all long been linked to the history of rugby league in Queensland. Initially, the founders of the club favored the official blue and gold colours of Brisbane City Council. However, Sydney advertiser John Singleton advised the board that "Queenslanders had been booing players wearing blue for more than three-quarters of a century." As a result, the traditional maroon and white colours of Queensland along with gold, symbolizing the Queensland sunshine,
 were adopted as the club's colours.

In the inaugural 1988 season, the club's jersey design featured the top third being gold, the middle being alternating hoops of maroon and white and the bottom third being maroon. Although this design featured gold strongly, it did not please everyone as the jersey had to differentiate from the maroon and white of Manly-Warringah Sea Eagles and the maroon of the Queensland rugby league team. Following a number of design changes in the 1990s including a predominantly white jersey from 1997 to 1998, blue was added to the jersey in 2001 as a minor colour to show the aforementioned historical link with the colours of Brisbane. However, this was later dropped from the design in favor of a mainly maroon jersey with gold trim.

At the 1995 Rugby League World Sevens tournament, the club introduced a new combination of jersey colours – mauve, aqua and white. Brisbane Broncos Marketing Manager Shane Edwards stated that it "will become our Sevens strip... but we will never change the Broncos' colours." In 2001, following the release of the club's predominantly white with navy-blue and maroon away jersey, the National Rugby League ordered the club to produce a third jersey since the new away jersey clashed with the home jerseys of the Penrith Panthers, Melbourne Storm and New Zealand Warriors. An aqua strip using the same design as the jerseys used from 1999 to 2001 was worn, which was much derided by the local media. Following two years of public pressure the club dropped the jersey in favor of the design worn against Newcastle in 2003.

International Sports Clothing became Brisbane's kit provider in October 2016, replacing long-time suppliers Nike.

Stadium

In their first five seasons, the Broncos played their matches at the 52,500 capacity Lang Park (or more commonly referred to as "Suncorp Stadium" due to sponsorship of Suncorp, Australia), the ground considered to be the home of rugby league in Queensland. However, following ongoing conflict with the Queensland Rugby League and Lang Park Trust due to a sponsorship conflict with the QRL having a commercial agreement with Castlemaine XXXX brewery with prominent signs around the ground, while the Broncos were sponsored by rival brewery Powers who were not permitted any permanent signs (the Broncos initially got around this by not using the change rooms at half time during games, instead sitting on the ground with a temporary protective banner surrounding them which just happened to have prominent Powers logos), the team relocated to the 60,000 capacity ANZ Stadium in 1993 (ANZ had been the main stadium of the 1982 Commonwealth Games). The club's home match attendance, which had averaged 19,637 at Lang Park, increased to 43,200 at the new ground in the first season following the club's first premiership title in the previous season. However, despite the team's second premiership in 1993, crowds gradually declined and it was not until 2002 that the club again registered more than the 1996 average attendance of 23,712. ANZ Stadium, as the Queensland Sport and Athletics Centre was called at the time due to sponsorship rights, was featured on an episode of The Mole in April 2002.

With the Queensland Government's $280 million redevelopment of Lang Park, the team moved back to the refurbished and renamed Suncorp Stadium upon its completion in mid-2003. The more centrally-located stadium has begun to attract larger crowds, with the 2006 average attendance of 31,208 being significantly higher than the Newcastle Knights with 21,848 and about double the regular season competition average of 15,601.

The club record attendance for a regular season match is 58,593, set against the St. George Dragons in the final round of the 1993 season. The record attendance for a match at Suncorp Stadium is 50,859 for Darren Lockyer's final home game. Before kick-off at the Stadium an instrumental version of Led Zeppelin's "Kashmir" is routinely played. Whenever the Broncos score a try, "Chelsea Dagger" by The Fratellis is played.

The Broncos all-time home attendance record was set at ANZ Stadium during the 1997 Super League Grand Final when 58,912 saw the Broncos defeat the Cronulla Sharks 26–8 to claim the only Super League premiership played in Australia.

Home Venues

Buck The Bronco 
Buck the Bronco is currently the Broncos mascot.

Brisbane Broncos Leagues Club
Located in 98 Fulcher Road, Queensland, Australia (4059), the Brisbane Broncos League is the Broncos training ground and includes a restaurant and buffet. The Brisbane Broncos have also purchased the TAFE (opposite the club) and have recently built a new training field and building. The Broncos' training ground is also used for the Australian Kangaroos.

The club is located within Gilbert Park and opened in 1988. Wests Juniors Football Club originally called Gilbert Park home, with the small clubhouse beside owned by Wests Old Boys. These two clubs merged in 1967 and in 1987 was purchased to form Broncos Leagues Club.

Supporters
The Brisbane Broncos have the largest fan base of any NRL club and they have been voted the most popular rugby league team in Australia for several years. A Broncos supporters group called "The Thoroughbreds" which is made up of prominent businessmen, made an unsuccessful bid to purchase News Ltd's controlling share of the club in 2007.

Average regular season attendance
 1988: 16,111 (lowest home attendance)
 1989: 18,217
 1990: 22,709
 1991: 19,463
 1992: 21,687
 1993: 43,200 (largest home attendance)
 1994: 37,705
 1995: 35,902
 1996: 23,712
 1997: 19,298
 1998: 20,073
 1999: 22,763
 2000: 21,239
 2001: 19,710
 2002: 20,131
 2003: 24,326
 2004: 28,667
 2005: 30,331
 2006: 31,208
 2007: 32,868
 2008: 33,426
 2009: 34,587
 2010: 35,032
 2011: 33,209
 2012: 33,337
 2013: 30,480
 2014: 34,235
 2015: 36,096
 2016: 34,476
 2017: 31,929
 2018: 31,394
 2019: 29,516
 2020: 8,624 (Attendance numbers impacted by crowd restrictions due to the COVID-19 pandemic)
 2021: 21,444 (Attendance numbers impacted by crowd restrictions due to the COVID-19 pandemic)
 2022: 29,594
Notable supporters

Notable supporters of this club, amongst others, include:

 Carl Barron, Australian comedian
 Allan Border, Australian cricket captain
 Quentin Bryce, 25th Governor General of Australia
 Cate Campbell, Malawian-born Australian swimmer and Olympic gold medalist
 Bernard Fanning, lead singer of Powderfinger
 Wayne Goss, 34th Premier of Queensland
 Ian Healy, former international wicket-keeper
 Les Hiddins, former Australian soldier, known as "The Bush Tucker Man"
 Mark Hunt, mixed martial artist
 Dami Im, singer, winner of The X Factor Australia in 2013
 Steve Irwin, TV personality and environmentalist
 Lincoln Lewis, Australian actor
 Craig Lowndes, V8 Supercars driver
 Chris Lynn, Australian cricketer
 Patty Mills, professional basketballer
 Sally Pearson, Olympic athlete
 Rick Price, musician
 Terry Price, professional golfer
 Patrick Rafter, retired tennis player
 Kevin Rudd, 26th Prime Minister of Australia
 Karl Stefanovic, television presenter
 Samantha Stosur, professional tennis player and 2011 US Open champion
 Andrew Symonds, international cricketer
 Ken Talbot, mining magnate
 Don Walker, musician

Corporate
The Broncos are the only publicly listed NRL club. The largest shareholder in the Broncos is Nationwide News Pty Ltd, a subsidiary of News Corp Australia, which as of 30 June 2021, owned 68.87%. BGM Projects is another major shareholder.

John Ribot, a former first grade rugby league player in Queensland and New South Wales, was the club's original chief executive officer (CEO). Ribot left when he signed to become the CEO of the rebel Australian rugby league competition Super League. (p. 24,112) Shane Edwards, the Broncos Marketing Manager at the time, was promoted to CEO and later resigned. Bruno Cullen, who had been with the Broncos' off-field staff since 1989, became the club's third CEO in 2003.
 In 2011 Cullen was replaced by current CEO Paul White. Rugby league player Darren Lockyer is a member of the board of directors.

Kia are the major sponsor of the Broncos as of 2020, replacing NRMA Insurance. Nova 106.9 are the main radio sponsors after taking over from rival station B105 FM in late 2006. Live broadcasts of all Broncos matches are provided by both ABC Radio Brisbane and Triple M. Channel Nine Queensland also sponsors the Broncos, although former player Shane Webcke is signed to rival Seven Queensland.

In 2012, local Brisbane based company Firstmac replaced WOW Sight & Sound as sleeve sponsor for three years to launch into the retail financial services market. This sponsorship took only 9 days to negotiate following the announcement of WOW Sight & Sound going into receivership. Firstmac stipulated a unique clause in their contract that they could pay for 250 tickets to be distributed to WOW Sight & Sound staff that lost their jobs. Firstmac has since launched a Firstmac Broncos home loan in conjunction with their new sponsorship agreement.

Asics are the Broncos current apparel provider as of November 2020.

Between 1997 and 2016, the club's apparel was manufactured by Nike. Between 2017 and 2020, International Sports Clothing served as the club's apparel manufacturer. From the 2021 season, Asics will supply the club's on-and-off-field apparel.

Sponsors 
The Brisbane Broncos' first major sponsor was Powers Brewing who sponsored them until 1993. The Broncos currently have a number of sponsorship deals with the following: 
 Kia Motors
 NRMA Insurance
 ISC

 Firstmac / loans.com.au
 Asics
 Coca-Cola
 Powerade
 Deadly Choices
 Arrow Energy
 Nova 106.9
 Nine News Queensland
 McDonald's
 Hog's Breath Cafe
 The Courier-Mail
 Slater & Gordon
 University of Queensland
 Llewellyn
 XXXX Gold
 Splatt Lawyers

Players

2023 NRL Squad

2023 Squad Movement

Signed

Released

Extended

Representative Players

Notable players
Due to the club's premiership success and its being the dominant Queensland team in the competition for the majority of its participation, the Brisbane Broncos' list of representative players is extensive. Consequently, there have been a large number of Queensland Maroons in the team. In 2007, a 20-man legends team was announced to celebrate the club's 20-year anniversary.

1988 First-ever Squad 
 Colin Scott – Fullback
 Joe Kilroy – Wing
 Chris Johns – Centre
 Gene Miles – Centre 
 Michael Hancock – Wing
 Wally Lewis – Five-eighth
 Allan Langer – Halfback
 Terry Matterson – Lock
 Brett Le Man – Second Row
 Keith Gee – Second Row
 Greg Dowling – Prop
 Greg Conescu – Hooker
 Bryan Niebling – Prop
 Mark Hohn – Interchange
 Billy Noke – Interchange
 Craig Grauf – Interchange
 Wayne Bennett – Coach

Personnel

Coaches

Current Personnel

Statistics and records

The Brisbane Broncos are the second most successful club in terms of percentage of total games won, having won 63.63% of their games, as of 29 August 2012. This is marginally less (0.01%) than first placed Melbourne Storm. In their twenty completed seasons, the club has made a total of seven Grand Finals, winning six and losing one to the North Queensland Cowboys in 2015. They are one of only two clubs to have won the World Club Challenge twice, and were the first club to do so on British soil. They also won the now defunct Panasonic Cup in 1989.

Former team captain Darren Lockyer holds the record for the most First Grade games for the club. Lockyer also held the record for the most points scored for the club, tallying 1,171 since his debut in 1995, before Corey Parker overtook him in August 2015 with 1,222 career points for Brisbane Broncos. Darren Lockyer also holds the club record of 272 points in a season, having achieved this in 1998. Darren Lockyer was named Fullback in Queensland Rugby League's Team of the Century in 1998–2007 and he won 4 grand finals with the Brisbane Broncos (including a Clive Churchill Medal) and a World Cup title with Australia. He also won the Golden Boot Award for world's best player in this position before switching to Five-eighth.

Steve Renouf also shares the club record for the most tries in a season with Darren Smith at 23. After over a decade after Steve Renouf's move from the Brisbane Broncos to Wigan Warriors, he was still the club's all-time try scorer with a 142 career tries. Five times, he scored 4 tries in a single match from 1991 to 1998 and was known as one of the greatest centres the game has ever seen. In 2008, Steve Renouf was named centre in the Indigenous Team of the Century.

Lote Tuqiri's tally of 26 points from three tries and seven goals in a single match against the Northern Eagles remains the club record for most individual points in a game. He also won the 1999 Brisbane Broncos season's rookie of the year award.

Corey Parker holds the record for most goals in a game kicking ten in a round one clash of 2008, breaking the previous mark of nine kicked by Lockyer in 1998 and matched by Michael De Vere in 2001. He also scored a try on debut during 2001. Parker converted ten from ten goals in the Broncos 48–12 win over the Penrith Panthers in which Parker scored 24 points placing him in equal second place on the most points in a match tally. In 2013, Corey Parker was named Dally M Lock of the Year and in 2009 received the Broncos' Paul Morgan Award. Corey Parker also received the Paul Morgan Award yet again in 2013 and 2015.

 Six players have scored four tries in a match for the Brisbane Broncos including Steve Renouf (5 times), Wendell Sailor, Karmichael Hunt, Justin Hodges, Denan Kemp and former Australian Wallabies player, Israel Folau. Wendell Sailor has held the record for the most tries scored in a finals match (four tries against St. George Illawarra Dragons, Semi-final 2001, Brisbane won 44–28).

The most field goals in a match however hasn't been past one field goal which has been accomplished several times.

The club's biggest winning margin is 65 points, achieved in 2007 in a 71–6 victory over the Newcastle Knights. Their heaviest defeat is a 59–0 loss by the Sydney Roosters on 4 June 2020 . The club's highest winning margin in a Grand Final is by 26 points (38–12, against Canterbury Bulldogs, 1998).

In the 2017 NRL season, the Brisbane Broncos' highest try-scorer was former Gold Coast Titans centre James Roberts with 15 tries. The highest points-scorer was Jordan Kahu with 67 goals and 8 tries. The most metres run in the season was by Tautau Moga with 3410 metres.

Brisbane Broncos Win–loss records

Active Teams

Discontinued Teams

Season summary

Finals Appearances
27 (1990, 1992, 1993, 1994, 1995, 1996, 1997, 1998, 1999, 2000, 2001, 2002, 2003, 2004, 2005, 2006, 2007, 2008, 2009, 2011, 2012, 2014, 2015, 2016, 2017, 2018, 2019)

Honours

 World Club Challenge: 2
 1992, 1997
 Premiership: 6
 1992, 1993, 1997, 1998, 2000, 2006, 
 Minor Premiership: 4
  1992, 1997, 1998, 2000
 Panasonic Cup: 1
 1989
 Lotto Challenge Cup: 1
 1991
 Tooheys Challenge Cup: 1
 1995

Club Rivalries

North Queensland Cowboys 

Brisbane's biggest rivals are the North Queensland Cowboys. The two clubs had a long-standing 'sibling rivalry' with North Queensland characterized as the underdog.  Brisbane initially were dominant in the fixture with Brisbane going undefeated against North Queensland for the first nine years until North Queensland recorded their first ever victory in the 2004 elimination final defeating Brisbane 10-0.

The rivalry reached new heights after North Queensland won their first premiership, beating Brisbane at the 2015 Grand Final at ANZ Stadium. Considered one of the greatest grand finals of all time, the win established North Queensland as competitive equals. Between 2015 and 2017 a staggering three of five games played between the two clubs led to a Golden Point finish.  In the final round of the 2020 NRL season, North Queensland condemned Brisbane to their first ever Wooden Spoon.  Brisbane needed to win the match to overtake Canterbury-Bankstown but lost the match.

It is regarded as one of the greatest modern sports rivalries earning the nickname of the "Queensland derby".

Sydney Roosters 

Since the 2000 Grand Final between the Roosters and Broncos, both clubs have built on a rivalry which still continues today. From 2002 to 2010, the Roosters and the Broncos played in the traditional Good Friday match.

Newcastle Knights 

Another notable rivalry is with fellow debutants from 1988, the Newcastle Knights. From the omission of the Gold Coast Chargers at the end of the 1998 season until the arrival of the Gold Coast Titans in the 2007 season, the Knights were geographically the closest club to the Broncos. Adding to this, players from both Brisbane and Newcastle have featured heavily in the annual State of Origin sides for Queensland and New South Wales respectively.

Gold Coast Titans 

The match between Brisbane and the Gold Coast is known as the South Queensland Derby. The media and supporters of both club's have described this fixture as Big Brother against Little Brother. Brisbane are the more successful team in the fixture with the Gold Coast only defeating Brisbane eleven times since 2007. The two club's have only met in two finals matches, the first being in 2009 when Brisbane won 40-32.  The other time being in 2016 when the Gold Coast reached the finals by default due to Parramatta's salary cap points deduction.  Brisbane won the match 44-28.

The Gold Coast are geographically the closest club to Brisbane. Brisbane previously enjoyed derbies with the Gold Coast Chargers, until the Chargers exited the competition at the end of 1998 season, returning as the Gold Coast Titans in 2007 and before that with the Gold Coast Seagulls and Gold Coast-Tweed Giants. In the 2021 NRL season, Brisbane recorded the biggest ever comeback in their history by defeating the Gold Coast 36-28 after being down 22-0.

Melbourne Storm

Since the 2006 NRL Grand Final where Brisbane edged out Melbourne 15-8, a rivalry still continues today between the two clubs.  The two sides have played each other in multiple finals matches . Adding to this, both Brisbane and Melbourne usually feature heavily in Queensland's annual State of Origin side.  Since the 2006 decider, Brisbane have played Melbourne on 34 occasions and only won four times.

Redcliffe Dolphins

Club affiliations 
The Brisbane Broncos have three split feeder clubs from the Queensland Cup: Northern Suburbs Devils, Souths Logan Magpies and Wynnum-Manly Seagulls. Former feeder clubs of the Broncos are the now-defunct Aspley Broncos and Toowoomba Clydesdales, active clubs Central Queensland Capras, who switched to The Dolphins, Ipswich Jets who switched to Newcastle Knights, Redcliffe Dolphins who switched to New Zealand Warriors, and Burleigh Bears who switched to the Gold Coast Titans.

Club victory song 
The current Broncos' victory song, "We're The Broncos" was written in 1995 (the earlier rock song "Let's Go Broncos" written by Bob Bax in 1988 remains a club anthem)

Lyrics:

We're the Broncos

The mighty Broncos

We keep fighting every second till the end

We're the Broncos

The greatest team on earth

We're the heart of all Queensland

Never stop

We never rest

On and on we beat the best

Never giving up we bleed maroon and gold

For the league

We risk it all

Miles above

We're standing tall

We're the finest and the greatest club of all

We're the Broncos

The mighty Broncos

We keep fighting every second till the end

We breathe in our soul

The best game of all

We are the Broncos of Queensland

Hey!!

Women's team

In 2017, the Brisbane Broncos launched a bid to enter a team in the inaugural NRL Women's Premiership in 2018. On 27 March 2018, the club won a license to participate in the inaugural NRL Women's season, on the back of a strong bid which included the NRL's desire for a geographical spread. Paul Dyer was named as the coach of the women's side, but stepped down after the inaugural season to concentrate on his role as game development manager. Kelvin Wright was named his replacement in May 2019.

In June 2018, Ali Brigginshaw, Brittany Breayley, Heather Ballinger, Teuila Fotu-Moala and Caitlyn Moran were unveiled as the club's first five signings. Tain Drinkwater was also appointed the CEO of the team.

The club won the inaugural NRL Women's Premiership title by defeating the Sydney Roosters by 34–12 in the 2018 NRL Women's Premiership Grand Final.

Current squad

See also

Sport in Queensland
Rugby league in Queensland

References

External links

Official sites
 Broncos Official Web Page
 Broncos Leagues Club

Statistics & information sites
 Rugby League Tables
 RL1908 Broncos History
Supporter sites
 BroncosHQ – Brisbane Broncos Fan Discussion Forum

 
Companies listed on the Australian Securities Exchange
National Rugby League clubs
News Corp Australia
Rugby clubs established in 1987
Rugby league teams in Brisbane
1987 establishments in Australia